The Vokė is a river in south-east Lithuania. It is a left tributary of Neris. Vokė flows from Papis Lake, near Merkys.

References

Rivers of Lithuania